Westbourne is an unincorporated community and coal town in Campbell County, Tennessee. Their post office  is closed.

References

Unincorporated communities in Campbell County, Tennessee
Unincorporated communities in Tennessee
Coal towns in Tennessee